Bruno Gonçalves Maia de Souza (born 19 April 1988 in Além Paraíba), known as Bruno Maia, is a Brazilian footballer who plays for Portuguesa as defender.

Career statistics

References

External links

1988 births
Living people
Brazilian footballers
Association football defenders
América Futebol Clube (MG) players
Esporte Clube Mamoré players
Guarani FC players
Guarani Esporte Clube (MG) players
Red Bull Brasil players
Avaí FC players
Mirassol Futebol Clube players
América Futebol Clube (RN) players
Capivariano Futebol Clube players
Boa Esporte Clube players
Botafogo Futebol Clube (PB) players
Clube do Remo players
Sertãozinho Futebol Clube players
Campeonato Brasileiro Série B players
Campeonato Brasileiro Série C players
Associação Portuguesa de Desportos players